Brian Koopman (born 26 March 1996) is a Dutch football player who plays for amateur club SC 't Zand.

Club career
He made his professional debut in the Eerste Divisie for FC Den Bosch on 19 August 2016 in a game against Jong Ajax.

References

External links
 

1996 births
Footballers from Tilburg
Living people
Dutch footballers
FC Den Bosch players
Eerste Divisie players
Association football forwards